Harpagofututor is an extinct genus of cartilaginous fish from the Mississippian of North America.

It was an eel-shaped fish with almost no scales. About eight inches (20 cm) long, it swam with some help from its fins, but also relied on whole-body locomotion to move. The fish also had teeth sufficient for eating shellfish.

Harpagofututor is thought to be related to the cochliodonts, chimaeroids, and Chondrenchelys problematica.

The fish was discovered in the 1980s in Montana's Bear Gulch area by Adelphi University palaeontologist Richard Lund, who has been exploring the limestone formations of the region since 1969.
 The area was thought to be the location of a shallow bay. Fish remains are found throughout the area. Further examinations of the soft tissue pigments of these fossilized remains led to more information about the fish and information about its internal organs, including its reproductive system.

Sources
  
 Aquagenesis: The Origin and Evolution of Life in the Sea by Richard Ellis  
 The Rise of Fishes: 500 Million Years of Evolution by John A. Long

References

Prehistoric cartilaginous fish genera
Carboniferous cartilaginous fish
Mississippian fish of North America